David John Ellis (born 25 April 1937) is a Canadian long-distance runner. He competed in the men's 5000 metres at the 1968 Summer Olympics.

References

1937 births
Living people
Canadian male long-distance runners
Olympic track and field athletes of Canada
Athletes from Toronto
Pan American Games medalists in athletics (track and field)
Pan American Games silver medalists for Canada
Athletes (track and field) at the 1966 British Empire and Commonwealth Games
Athletes (track and field) at the 1967 Pan American Games
Athletes (track and field) at the 1968 Summer Olympics
Athletes (track and field) at the 1970 British Commonwealth Games
Medalists at the 1967 Pan American Games
Commonwealth Games competitors for Canada